Nicholas Anthony Frascella (July 6, 1914 – April 9, 2000) was an American professional basketball player. He played in the National Basketball League for the Akron Goodyear Wingfoots and averaged 2.1 points per game.

References

1914 births
2000 deaths
Akron Goodyear Wingfoots players
American men's basketball players
American military personnel of World War II
Basketball players from Trenton, New Jersey
Forwards (basketball)
Trenton Central High School alumni
Wooster Fighting Scots men's basketball players